Arctic Rally, currently Arctic Lapland Rally and also known as Tunturiralli, is an annual rally competition held on ice- and snow-covered roads in Rovaniemi, Lapland, Finland. It has been organized continuously since 1966. In 2021, a separate event based on the rally became part of the World Rally Championship as Arctic Rally Finland. The rally is also part of the Finnish Rally Championship and has previously been a round of the European Rally Championship until 2003 and the FIA Cup for Rally Drivers in 1977 and 1978. 

In 2021 the rally was held twice, once between 14-16 January for the Finnish Rally Championship, and again between 26-28 February for the World Rally Championship, as a replacement for the canceled Rally Sweden.

The rally has been won by five World Rally Champions: Marcus Grönholm, Tommi Mäkinen, Hannu Mikkola, Timo Salonen and Ari Vatanen. In recent years, it has attracted competitors from circuit racing. The 2009 entry list included four current or former Formula One drivers; JJ Lehto finished ninth on his tenth Arctic Rally, Kimi Räikkönen 13th on his first-ever rally competition, Mika Häkkinen 19th on his fourth outing in the event while a gearbox failure ended Mika Salo's third Arctic Rally. Most recently, Valtteri Bottas finished fifth overall in 2019, ninth in 2020 and sixth in January 2021. In 2020, Kalle Rovanperä won his first ever event driving a World Rally Car, the Toyota Yaris WRC. Juho Hänninen won the January 2021 event.

Winners

Wins by manufacturer

References

External links

  (Arctic Lapland Rally) 
  (Arctic Rally Finland) 

Lapland (Finland)
Rally competitions in Finland
Auto racing series in Finland
Arctic challenges
Arctic
Arctic
Sport in the Arctic